The 2020 season was Kuala Lumpur's 42nd season in competitive season and the 1st season in the Malaysia Premier League since relegation 2019 season.

Overview
By 14 December 2019, 23 players already signed a contract with the club for 2020 Malaysia Premier League season.

On 26 December 2019, Nidzam Adzha joined Kuala Lumpur as club's new head coach.

On 3 January 2020, Azamat Baimatov joined the club from Dordoi Bishkek.

On 6 January 2020, the club announced Guy Gnabouyou joined the club.

On 31 October 2020, Kuala Lumpur suffered defeat to Kuching in last league match.

Players

Current squad

Statistics

Appearances and goals

|-
!colspan="14"|Players away from the club on loan:
|-
!colspan="14"|Players who left Kuala Lumpur during the season:
|}

References

Kuala Lumpur City F.C.
2020
Kuala Lumpur